Bamzooki (styled as BAMZOOKi) was a British children's television game show for CBBC. Teams competed in knockout tournaments consisting of a series of augmented reality contests using their own virtual mobile creatures, known as "Zooks." The zooks were created by the contestants using a computer-generated toolkit developed by Gameware Development.  The toolkit was free to download from the CBBC website for the public to use.

The original series premiered in March 2004 on the CBBC channel, and was presented by Jake Humphrey. It ran until 2006 after sixty episodes and three seasons. A new thirteen-part revival series set on a street, Bamzooki: Street Rules, premiered in November 2009 with new presenters—Barney Harwood and Gemma Hunt—a revamped toolkit with improved graphics and physics, new contests, new "House Zooks," a new format, and a "Zook Doctor."

History
Following the show's initial run, a new series entitled "Bamzooki: Street Rules" was broadcast between 2009 and 2010. The premise of Street Rules involves the competition being considered by the government as if it were an illegal combat sport, facing attempted crackdowns. There are now four teams in each episode, with one zook each. They take part in a street race at the beginning of each show, and the winning team gets to pick an opponent for the next game, which is one-on-one and best of three. The two losing zooks take part in another challenge called "Pressure Pusher," with the loser being destroyed. The final three do a time-trial challenge, and again the losing zook is destroyed. The final two battle it out on a rooftop assault course. The winner of this goes through to the next stage, as do the three losers who were fastest in the street race.  There are more house zooks too, a total of nine. These house zooks are called Mimi (she is also used as the symbol of Bamzooki in this series and is also used in the Boulder Dash and zook chicken games), The Beast, Peachy, Derek, Predator, Centi, Punka, Punkalicious, and Mean Green.

Technology

Bamzooki: Street Rules 
A Zook is an autonomous creature designed by users and contestants in the gameshow. Created using 3D primitives, Zooks move autonomously based on IK points that the designer assigns to them.

Using nature as inspiration, contestants design Zooks to compete against other Zooks in a variety of competitions. The tool kit for designing Zooks is offered for download on the show's website. Also, more recently, two new Zook-Kit features have been released that allow users to simulate the TV contests and then replay their Zooks' performances from multiple angles.

Gameware's Creature Labs team uses artificial life programming techniques to provide the Zooks' autonomous movement and behavior and integrates this with the BBC's virtual studio system to enable real-time visualizations in a studio setting.

The toolkit, the Bamzooki Zook Kit, enables users to build virtual creatures, called Zooks, and test them in a real-time, physically simulated environment. Kids used this software to build Zooks, which were submitted to the BBC. Teams were selected and invited into the studio to enter their Zooks in various contests. The new series "Bamzooki: Street Rules," which aired in November 2009, features fully interactive contests, where the participants direct their Zooks by shouting instructions, as well as contests set on the streets and rooftops. 36 teams were selected to take part in the championships, which included nine heats, a semi-final, and a final.

The software, as well as the manual, were freely available from the BBC website.Although designed to be easy enough to be used by children, it is highly flexible and versatile. Zooks are constructed from the ground up using basic component parts that the user shapes and sticks together. Users are not restricted to particular body designs or topologies, although the control system uses a standard Braitenberg architecture.

The BBC's Virtual Studio technology was used to enable real-time composition of the 3D-rendered graphics with live camera feeds. Each studio camera has a dedicated render PC to render the virtual scene from that camera's perspective. To know what a studio camera's perspective is, each camera is fitted with a second "Free-D" camera that points towards the ceiling. On the ceiling are reflective, circular bar codes. The 3-D camera data is fed to a computer system that identifies the targets on the ceiling and calculates the camera's position and orientation 50 times a second. Series 4 adopted Vinten tracking peds instead of FREE-D as an alternative approach.

The contest runs in real time on a networked PC. All the clients receive contest scene information and render their scenes from their studio camera's point of view. A bank of color boxes then composites the virtual and the live feed together to provide a real-time composite. This video stream can be sent to the studio camera monitors so that camera operators can view the composite and hence follow the action in real time.

There is a non-child user base establishing itself and using the toolkit (a modified version of the Bonsai artificial life program) for their own purposes.

Community

A popular aim in Bamzooki is to get a Zook into the galleries or leagues, as they are often the most viewed and downloaded Zooks. To get into the leagues, you have to make a maxed-out zook on a specific event; these events are sprint, block push, hurdles, high jump, and lap. Every month, the CBBC Bamzooki site releases a new gallery based on a topic like "space zooks" or "spooky zooks." For every gallery, there are 16 spaces, and the Zook moderators choose the best-looking zooks to take those places.

A relatively new league is the Ultimate Zook Leaderboard, where scores from all the trials are aggregated into one score, which zooks are then compared on.

Episodes

References

External links
 
 
 

2004 British television series debuts
2010 British television series endings
2000s British children's television series
2010s British children's television series
BBC high definition shows
BBC children's television shows
British children's game shows
Gameware Development games
Mixed reality
Video games based on game shows
English-language television shows
Television shows shot at BBC Elstree Centre